Bailey-Estes House is a historic home located at Wake Forest, Wake County, North Carolina.  It was built about 1864, and is a two-story, frame I-house, with a -story rear kitchen ell added about 1880.  It has a side gable roof and three single-shoulder, stuccoed stone chimneys.  Also on the property is a contributing family cemetery.

It was listed on the National Register of Historic Places in 2010.

References 

Houses on the National Register of Historic Places in North Carolina
Houses completed in 1864
Houses in Wake County, North Carolina
National Register of Historic Places in Wake County, North Carolina